Pädaste is a village on the Estonian island Muhu. It is located on the southern coast of the island by the Gulf of Riga. Administratively, Pädaste belongs to Muhu Parish, Saare County. In 2000 the village had a population of 48.

Pädaste is most known for its eclectic manor house, the Pädaste manor. Pädaste manor is the only remaining manor house on Muhu island. It was established as a manorial estate in the 16th century.

References

External links
Pädaste Manor, a small luxury resort & SPA (Official site)

Villages in Saare County
Populated coastal places in Estonia
Houses completed in 1875